was a Japanese samurai of the Sengoku period, who served the Shimazu clan.

He fought during the invasion of Higo Province, and also at the Battle of Mimigawa (1578).

In 1587, during Kyushu Campaign against Toyotomi Hideyoshi, Hisatora died after falling from his horse.

Samurai
1558 births
1587 deaths
Shimazu retainers